Yasuyoshi is a masculine Japanese given name.

Possible writings
Yasuyoshi can be written using many different combinations of kanji characters. Here are some examples:

靖義, "peaceful, justice"
靖吉, "peaceful, good luck"
靖良, "peaceful, good"
靖能, "peaceful, capacity"
靖芳, "peaceful, virtuous/fragrant"
靖善, "peaceful, virtuous"
康義, "healthy, justice"
康吉, "healthy, good luck"
康良, "healthy, good"
康能, "healthy, capacity"
康芳, "healthy, virtuous/fragrant"
康善, "healthy, virtuous"
安義, "tranquil, justice"
安吉, "tranquil, good luck"
保義, "preserve, justice"
保吉, "preserve, good luck"
保良, "preserve, good"
泰義, "peaceful, justice"
泰良, "peaceful, good"
泰能, "peaceful, capacity"
八洲能, "8, continent, capacity"
易芳, "divination, virtuous/fragrant"

The name can also be written in hiragana やすよし or katakana ヤスヨシ.

Notable people with the name

, Japanese actor and voice actor
Yasuyoshi Komizo (小溝 泰義, born 1948), Japanese diplomat
, Japanese footballer
, Japanese botanist

Japanese masculine given names